Rosmuc or Ros Muc, sometimes anglicised as Rosmuck, is a village in the Conamara Gaeltacht of County Galway, Ireland. It lies halfway between the town of Clifden and the city of Galway. Irish is the predominant spoken language in the area, with the electoral division of Turlough, Rosmuc, representing one of the highest percentages of Irish-speaking people in the country. The townland of Rosmuck is part of the civil parish of Kilcummin.

History and etymology 
It is estimated that people first settled in Rosmuc in AD 400, one hundred years before Naomh Briocán (Saint Briocán) brought Christianity to the area.

It is believed that the name 'Ros Muc' comes from the old Irish "the peninsula of rounded hills", ros meaning "promontory or headland" and muc meaning "rounded hills" or "pig". This may derive from a perception that the rounded hills on the horizon and surrounding the district look like the rounded backs of farm animals.

Population 

The population of the Rosmuc area is estimated to be around 450 people. During the 20th century, there had been a decline in the population, mainly due to emigration, but this has subsided in more recent years.

As of the 2011 census, Rosmuc townland had a population of 72 people.

Irish language 

As of 2006, there were 557 people living in the Ros Muc Electoral Division, and 87% of these were native Irish speakers. According to an analysis of the census a total of 91.9% of adults over nineteen years old said they spoke Irish on a daily basis.

Literature 
The area has been home to a number of literary figures, including Irish revolutionary and language activist Patrick Pearse (Pádraig Mac Piarais or An Ṗiarsaċ) who had a summer residence there in the early 1900s and set several of his short stories in the area. Pearse was based in his Rosmuc cottage when he wrote the graveside oration, "Ireland unfree shall never be at peace", given at the funeral of Jeremiah O'Donovan Rossa in 1915.

Another local writer was Pádraic Ó Conaire, who wrote 26 books, 473 stories, 237 essays and 6 plays partly set in the region. These included M'asal Beag Dubh (My Little Black Donkey) and the novella Deoraíocht (Exile).

Education
Rosmuc has had a long-term association with Coláiste na bhFiann, which provides host accommodation for students learning Irish during the summer months.

The local national (primary) school is named for Saint Briocán. As of 2020, this gaelscoil had an enrollment of 37 pupils.

Built heritage 

Among the local landmarks is Pearse's Cottage, which attracts up to ten thousand visitors each year. This cottage was built by Patrick Pearse (Irish: Pádraig Mac Piarais) in 1909. Pearse first came to the area in April 1903 as an examiner for Conradh na Gaeilge. Rosmuc and its people made an impression on him, and he decided to build a holiday home on a site overlooking Loch Eiliúrach. Pearse's Cottage later became a summer school for students from Pearse's school in Dublin, St. Enda's. The cottage is now open to the public as a heritage site and is a designated national monument.

The local Roman Catholic church, Séipéal an Ioncolnaithe, was built in 1844.

Sport and culture 
Rosmuc, along with its neighbours Camus and An Sraith Salach, is represented by the Na Piarsaigh Gaelic Athletic Association club. This club fields Gaelic football teams in several competitions. The youth team up to minors are called Carna Caiseal/Na Piarsaigh.

Until 2016, a soccer team, Cumann Sacar Naomh Briocain represented the area in the Galway district league.

A traditional Sean-nós dancing festival has historically been held in late January or early February, close to St. Brigid's Day (1 February). This festival, Féile Chóilín Sheáin Dharach, was established in 2001.

Townlands 
Townlands in Rosmuc include: Gleann Chatha, An Gort Mór, Inbhear, Turlach, Ros Dubh, An Tamhnaigh Bhig, Snámh Bó, Cill Bhriocáin, An Aill Bhuí, An tOileán Mór, An Turlach Beag, Salalaoi, An Baile Thair, An Siléar, Inis Eilte, An Cladhnach, Cladach ó Dheas, Gairfean, Ros Cíde, Doire Iorrais

Notable people
Notable residents have included:
 Patrick Pearse (Pádraig Mac Piarais), Irish language activist and revolutionary
 Caitlín Maude, poet, playwright and Irish language activist was raised in Cill Bhriocáin in Rosmuc
 Proinsias Mac Aonghusa, broadcaster, writer, journalist and former president of Conradh na Gaeilge 
 Sean (John) Mannion, light-middleweight boxer and later a boxing trainer active in the area.
 Mary Walsh, the mother of Marty Walsh, the Mayor of Boston, is a native of Ros Cíde, a townland near Ros Muc
 Patrick Nee, an Irish-American mobster and author from South Boston, Massachusetts, is a native of Rosmuc
 Linda Bhreathnach, actress and director, was born and raised in Rosmuc

References 

Towns and villages in County Galway
Gaeltacht places in County Galway
Gaeltacht towns and villages
Articles on towns and villages in Ireland possibly missing Irish place names